Dunghal mac Flaithniadh, King of Umaill, died 776.

Dunghal's relationship to the previous king, Flannabhra, is unknown, as he does not seem to appear in the extant genealogies.

See also
 Óró Sé do Bheatha 'Bhaile

External links
 http://www.ucc.ie/celt/published/T100005C/

References

 The History of Mayo, pp. 388–89, T.H. Knox, 1902.

8th-century Irish monarchs
Monarchs from County Mayo